Belarus–Serbia relations are foreign relations between Belarus and Serbia. On December 31, 1991, SFR Yugoslavia recognized Belarus by the decision on the recognition of the former republics of the USSR.

Belarus has an embassy in Belgrade. Serbia has an embassy in Minsk.

Relations
The important stimulus for closer economic and cultural cooperation, and also for the development of tourism, is the visa-free regime which has been in force between Belarus and Serbia since 2000. Serbian artists regularly take part in the Slavianski Bazaar in Vitebsk and have won several awards over the years.

The contract-legal basis of cooperation of Belarus and Serbia includes 20 signed agreements which cover almost all areas of bilateral interests.

Following the 2020 Belarusian presidential election, Serbia signed the Declaration initiated by the European Union rejecting the election results and criticizing crackdown against those protesting.

Trade
In 2006, Belarusian exports to Serbia were tractors, potash fertilizers, salt, ferrous metal, twisted wires and cotton fabric. Serbian exports to Belarus were pipes, rubber hoses and sleeves, synthetic polymer paints and varnishes, rough-grinding machine tools, honing machines, and modular machines for metal processing. Belarus and Serbia signed a free trade agreement in 2009.

See also 
 Foreign relations of Belarus
 Foreign relations of Serbia
 Belarusians in Serbia
 Serbs in Belarus

References

External links 
 Bilateral relations with Belarus, Serbian MFA
 Bilateral relations with Serbia, Belarusian MFA
 Embassy of Serbia in Minsk
 Serbian MFA: list of bilateral treaties with Belarus

 
Bilateral relations of Serbia
Serbia